Fentimans Cherrytree Cola, is a fermented, botanical cherry-flavoured cola with Ginger and Herbal Extracts soft drink. It is the 9th flavour to be produced by Fentimans, and is brewed and distributed in the United States by Lion Brewery, Inc. The drink was launched in the US in summer 2011 and launched in the UK in early 2012.

In popular culture
Singer Redfoo has featured the drink prominently in the music video for his song "Let's Get Ridiculous."

References

External links
Fentimans UK - Facebook
Fentimans Soft Drinks Homepage
North American home of Fentimans Homepage
Cherrytree Cola Homepage
Cherrytree Records
Drink Fentimans - Facebook

Cherry colas
Products introduced in 2011